The 1999 Midwestern Collegiate Conference men's basketball tournament took place at the end of the 1999–2000 regular season. The tournament was hosted by University of Illinois at Chicago.

Seeds
All Midwestern Collegiate Conference schools played in the tournament. Teams were seeded by 1999–2000 Midwestern Collegiate Conference season record, with a tiebreaker system to seed teams with identical conference records.

Bracket

References

1999 Midwestern Collegiate Conference Men
Horizon League men's basketball tournament
Midwestern Collegiate Conference men's basketball tournament